Rafael Cabrera Mustelier Airport or Rafael Cabrera Airport  is an airport serving Nueva Gerona, the capital city of the Isla de la Juventud special municipality in Cuba.

Facilities

Airline and destination

References

External links
 
 

Airports in Cuba
Buildings and structures in Isla de la Juventud
Nueva Gerona